Ernst Karchow (1892–1953) was a German stage and film actor.

Selected filmography
 Lotte (1928)
 We Stick Together Through Thick and Thin (1929)
 The Captain from Köpenick (1931)
 Inge and the Millions (1933)
 Gold (1934)
 Lady Windermere's Fan (1935)
 One Too Many on Board (1935)
 My Life for Maria Isabella (1935)
 The Traitor (1936)
 Patriots (1937)
 The Grey Lady (1937)
 Fanny Elssler (1937)
 The Deruga Case (1938)
 The Girl at the Reception (1940)
 Front Theatre (1942)
The Master of the Estate (1943)
 Back Then (1943)
 Tonelli (1943)
 The Noltenius Brothers (1945)
 Night of the Twelve (1949)

References

Bibliography
 Youngkin, Stephen. The Lost One: A Life of Peter Lorre. University Press of Kentucky, 2005.

External links

1892 births
1953 deaths
German male film actors
German male stage actors
Male actors from Berlin